Lewis Henry Streane was an Irish Anglican priest:

Streane was born in County Roscommon and educated at Trinity College, Dublin. He was Archdeacon of Glendalough from 1872 until 1888. He died on 17 May 1890.

References

Alumni of Trinity College Dublin
Archdeacons of Glendalough
19th-century Irish Anglican priests
1890 deaths
People from County Roscommon